Dyckia remotiflora is a plant species in the genus Dyckia. It is native to Argentina, Uruguay, and Brazil.

Four varieties are recognized:

Dyckia remotiflora var. angustior L.B.Sm. - Rio Grande do Sul
Dyckia remotiflora var. montevidensis (K.Koch) L.B.Sm.  - Entre Ríos, southern Brazil
Dyckia remotiflora var. remotiflora   - Uruguay, southern Brazil
Dyckia remotiflora var. tandilensis (Speg.) Cabrera - Buenos Aires but probably extinct

Cultivars
 Dyckia 'Suntan'

References

External links

remotiflora
Plants described in 1833
Garden plants of South America
Flora of South America